José Juncosa Bellmunt (2 February 1922 – 31 October 2003) was a Spanish football forward and manager.

Honours 
Atlético de Madrid
Spanish League: 1949-50, 1950-51
Copa Eva Duarte: 1951

References

External links
 
 
 National team data at BDFutbol
 
 

1922 births
2003 deaths
Spanish footballers
Footballers from Catalonia
Association football forwards
La Liga players
CF Reus Deportiu players
RCD Espanyol footballers
Atlético Madrid footballers
Spain international footballers
1950 FIFA World Cup players
Spanish football managers
Segunda División managers
Segunda División B managers
Tercera División managers
Córdoba CF managers
Xerez CD managers
UE Lleida managers
Pontevedra CF managers
Levante UD managers
CF Reus Deportiu managers
Catalonia international footballers